Quintessentially Unreal is the debut album by American Neo-cabaret artist Jill Tracy, released in 1996. It was nominated for California Music Awards in 1997 and 1998. Selections from the album were used on an NBC Hard Copy segment on Absinthe.

Track listing

1996 albums
Jill Tracy albums